Iain Milne (born 17 June 1956 in Edinburgh, Scotland) is a former Scotland international rugby union player and British & Irish Lion.

Rugby Union career

Amateur career

Educated at George Heriot's School in Edinburgh, he played prop and Milne later played for Heriot's FP and also the English side, Harlequin F.C. His nickname is "The Bear" in view of his physical size and strength.

Provincial career

He played for Edinburgh District; and was part of the 1986–87 Scottish Inter-District Championship winning side.

International career

He was part of the Grand Slam winning side in 1984. He made his Scotland debut 3 March 1979 against Ireland. His 42nd, and last, cap was won alongside his brother, Kenny who was representing his country for the first time as hooker. Iain's final appearance came during the 1990 tour of New Zealand although he did not participate in the Scotland's 1990 Grand Slam. In all he won 44 caps. Milne was known for his workrate, durability, hard tackling and courage.

Richard Bath writes of him that, he was
"one of the great anomalies of Scottish forward play, a lumbering bull of a man whose greatest strength lay in his sheer strength. Although a capable footballer, it was Milne's destiny to build up a reputation as a formidable scrummager; the type of man even the Paprembordes of the world thought twice about taking issue with. But then, as Milne himself says, it was his ability to provide a solid tight platform that would allow Scotland to play No. 8s such as Derek White and Iain Paxton in the second row so that they could play a more fluid style and get away with it."

Administrative career

In 2012, Milne took up the position of Vice President at Heriot's Rugby Club.

Family

His brothers David and Kenny were also capped by Scotland. Known as "the Three Bears, the Milne brothers made one appearance together as the Barbarians front row.

References

Sources

 Bath, Richard (ed.) The Complete Book of Rugby (Seven Oaks Ltd, 1997 )

External links
 Sporting heroes 1 *Sporting heroes 2

1956 births
Living people
British & Irish Lions rugby union players from Scotland
Rugby union props
Scotland international rugby union players
People educated at George Heriot's School
Heriot's RC players
Edinburgh District (rugby union) players
Harlequin F.C. players
Scottish rugby union players
Rugby union players from Edinburgh